Robert Chesley (March 22, 1943, Jersey City, New Jersey – December 5, 1990, San Francisco, California) was a playwright, theater critic and musical composer.

Biography 
Chesley earned his B.A. in music from Reed College in 1965. Between 1965 and 1975 he composed the music to over five dozen songs and choral works, chiefly to texts by poets such as Emily Dickinson, Willa Cather, James Agee, Walter de la Mare, Gertrude Stein and Walt Whitman. His instrumental works include the score to a 1972 film by Erich Kollmar.

In 1976 he moved to San Francisco and became theater critic at the San Francisco Bay Guardian, during its golden period when composer-actor Robert DiMatteo was also on the staff as film critic. In 1980 Theatre Rhinoceros produced Chesley's first one-act, Hell, I Love You; in 1984 his Night Sweat became one of the first produced full-length plays to deal with AIDS.

On August 31, 1986, his two-character play, Jerker, aired on the Pacifica Radio station KPFK's IMRU Program. Its frank sexual language immediately stirred controversy; later that year the FCC rewrote its rules governing the broadcast of "questionable" works, citing Jerker as the test case.

He was also co-founder of the Three-Dollar Bill Theater in New York City.

In total, Chesley wrote 10 full-length and 21 one-act plays. Several works were premiered posthumously and several of his major plays have been published.

Chesley died of AIDS in San Francisco at the age of 47. The Robert Chesley Award for Lesbian and Gay Playwriting, given annually by Publishing Triangle, is named in his honor. The Robert Chesley/Victor Bumbalo Foundation was established in 1993 to support playwrights of LGBT theatre, and has been in partnership with the Helene Wurlitzer Foundation in Taos, New Mexico, since 2009 to annually award a residency at the Foundation and a stipend to a selected playwright.

Plays

Beatitudes (1984)
Come Again: An Entertainment During The Siege (1987)
Dog Plays (1989)
Wild (Person, Tense) Dog
The Deploration of Rover
Hold
Happy V.D.
April First
Arbor Day
Dear Friends and Gentle Hearts
The Scream
A Christmas Card
Hell, I Love You and Breaking Up: Fragments (1981)
Madeleine de Lucien (1985)
Jerker, or The Helping Hand: A Pornographic Elegy with Redeeming Social Value and a Hymn to the Queer Men of San Francisco in Twenty Telephone Calls, Many of Them Dirty (1986)
A Dog's Life
Maggie's Play
Somebody's Little Boy
The Lost Doll
Laughter and Tears
Et Tu, Lesbo
Nocturnes (1983)
Night Sweat (1983)
Pigman: A Comedy in Three Acts (1985-6)
Private Theatricals: Morning, Noon & Night (1990)
Stray Dog Story : An Adventure In Ten Scenes (1981)

References

External links

Robert Chesley papers, 1978-2005, held by the Billy Rose Theatre Division, New York Public Library for the Performing Arts.

1943 births
1990 deaths
Writers from Jersey City, New Jersey
American male composers
20th-century American dramatists and playwrights
AIDS-related deaths in California
American LGBT musicians
American gay writers
American LGBT dramatists and playwrights
20th-century American composers
American male dramatists and playwrights
20th-century American male writers
20th-century American male musicians
Reed College alumni
20th-century American LGBT people